Alice Driscoll Burke (June 19, 1892 – May 14, 1974) was an American politician who was the mayor of Westfield, Massachusetts, from 1940 to 1943, 1954 to 1955, and 1958 to 1959. She was the first woman mayor in Massachusetts and New England.

Early life
Burke was born in Whitinsville, Massachusetts. She graduated from Northbridge High School and Fitchburg Normal School. She was a teacher in Hampden County, Massachusetts, for 20 years before entering politics.

Political career
In 1933, the Westfield School Committee adopted a policy of employing only unmarried female teachers and fired Burke from her job as a sixth-grade teacher. That fall, she was elected to the Westfield School Committee by four votes. In 1935, she was a finalist for mayor of Westfield, but was ruled ineligible because of an ordinance preventing individuals who were receiving a salary from the city from running for mayor (Burke was paid as a member of the school committee). She was eligible to run in 1937, but lost to incumbent Raymond H. Cowing by 561 votes. In 1939, she defeated Cowing 3637 votes to 3510. She was reelected in 1941, but lost to city councilor Arthur B. Long in 1943. In 1944, she was an unsuccessful candidate for the Massachusetts Senate in the Hampden, Hampshire, and Berkshire district, losing to Republican Ralph Lerche. She was a finalist for mayor in 1949 and 1951, but lost in the runoff election both times. Her 1953 campaign was a success, but she went on to lose reelection in 1955 to Leonard Warner. In 1957, she defeated Warner in a rematch. Her third term ended as quickly as her second, though, as she lost to John D. O'Connor. Her next attempts to regain the mayoralty failed as she lost to O'Connor in 1961 and Harold Martin in 1963 and 1965.

From 1968 to 1973, Burke was an at-large member of the Westfield city council.

Burke died on May 14, 1974, in Springfield, Massachusetts. She was 81 years old.

References

1892 births
1974 deaths
Schoolteachers from Massachusetts
20th-century American women educators
Fitchburg State University alumni
Massachusetts Democrats
Mayors of Westfield, Massachusetts
People from Northbridge, Massachusetts
20th-century American educators
20th-century American politicians
20th-century American women politicians
Women city councillors in Massachusetts
Massachusetts city council members